Stari Trg ob Kolpi (formerly also known as Poljane) is a settlement above the left bank of the Kolpa River in the Municipality of Črnomelj in the White Carniola area of southeastern Slovenia. The area is part of the traditional region of Lower Carniola and is now included in the Southeast Slovenia Statistical Region.

The local parish church is dedicated to Saint Joseph and belongs to the Roman Catholic Diocese of Novo Mesto. It is a medieval building that was extensively rebuilt in 1632 when it was converted to a three-aisled building with two side chapels. The main altar dates to the 18th century.

References

External links

Stari Trg ob Kolpi on Geopedia

Populated places in the Municipality of Črnomelj